Cirsonella ateles is a species of sea snail, a marine gastropod mollusk in the family Skeneidae.

Description
The white shell attains a height of 2 mm, its diameter also 2 mm. It is a rather solid, shining shell with a narrow and deep umbilicus. The apex is obtuse. The spire is composed of four convex whorls, separated by a marked suture. The body whorl goes slightly down to the aperture. The surface is smooth, except for the base of the body whorl, which has, seen from the periphery, low concentric striae, that disappear at a considerable distance from the umbilicus. The circular aperture has a continuous peristome. The columella has a thick, narrow callus that hardly reflects on the umbilical opening in young specimens but cover it completely in adults. The lip is simple.

Distribution
This species occurs in the Atlantic Ocean off the Azores.

References

 Gofas, S.; Le Renard, J.; Bouchet, P. (2001). Mollusca, in: Costello, M.J. et al. (Ed.) (2001). European register of marine species: a check-list of the marine species in Europe and a bibliography of guides to their identification. Collection Patrimoines Naturels, 50: pp. 180–213

ateles
Gastropods described in 1896